Robert Sekerka (born 1937) is an American physicist who is currently the University Professor Emeritus at Carnegie Mellon University.

References

Carnegie Mellon University faculty
21st-century American physicists
1937 births
Harvard University alumni
University of Pittsburgh alumni
Living people